Carlos Hurtado (born 7 October 1951) is a Peruvian former wrestler who competed in the 1972 Summer Olympics and in the 1980 Summer Olympics.

References

External links
 

1951 births
Living people
Olympic wrestlers of Peru
Wrestlers at the 1972 Summer Olympics
Wrestlers at the 1980 Summer Olympics
Peruvian male sport wrestlers
20th-century Peruvian people